Terrible Creek is a stream in western Ripley County in southeast  Missouri. It is a tributary of South Fork Buffalo Creek.

The stream source area lies just north of US Route 160 west of Briar.

Terrible Creek was so named on account of the rugged terrain near its course.

See also
List of rivers of Missouri

References

Rivers of Ripley County, Missouri
Rivers of Missouri